Bärbel Dieckmann ( Pritz, born 26 March 1949) is a German politician who was elected mayor of Bonn in 1994 and was in office until 2009. She is the first woman and Social Democrat to become mayor of Bonn.

Early life and education
The daughter of a diplomat, Dieckmann was born in Leverkusen in 1949.

Dieckmann graduated from Erzbischöfliche Liebfrauenschule Bonn in 1967. From 1967 until 1972, she studied philosophy, history and social sciences at the University of Bonn for a teaching degree. She was a teacher for twenty years.

Political career
In 1972 Dieckmann joined the Social Democratic Party of Germany (SPD).

From 1994 until 2009, Dieckmann served as mayor of Bonn. During her time in office, United Nations Volunteers (UNV) moved its headquarters to Bonn in 1999. Internationally, Dieckmann served as executive president of the Council of European Municipalities and Regions (CEMR) between 1999 and 2003. From 2005 she chaired the World Mayors Council on Climate Change (WMCCC); the office was established after the Kyoto Protocol came into force.

In 2005, Dieckmann became vice federal chairwoman of the SPD under chairman Matthias Platzeck, but left office two years later.

Life after politics
From 2008 until 2018, Dieckmann served as president of Welthungerhilfe. In 2019, she was appointed by Federal Minister for Economic Cooperation and Development Gerd Müller as co-chair (alongside Gerda Hasselfeldt) of a commission in charge of drafting recommendations on how to address the causes of displacement and migration.

Other activities
 Internationaler Demokratiepreis Bonn, Member of the Board of Trustees
 German Foundation for Peace Research (DSF), Ex-Officio Member of the Board (since 2009)
 Deutsche Post Stiftung, Member of the Scientific Council
 German Society for the United Nations (DGVN), Member
 Stadtwerke Bonn, Chairwoman of the Supervisory Board (2004-2009)

Recognition
In 2005 and 2006 Dieckmann was a finalist for World Mayor.

Personal life
Dieckmann is married to Jochen Dieckmann, former Minister of Justice, Minister of Finance, and Chairman of the SPD in Northrhine-Westphalia. They have four children, including Christoph and Markus Dieckmann.

Articles 
Dieckmann, Bärbel: "Food and Development Go Hand in Hand", Digital Development Debates, Issue 16 "Food & Farming", 2015.

See also 
 List of mayors of Bonn

References

External links
 Leverkusen who's who page
 CityMayors page
 WMCCC website

1949 births
Living people
People from Leverkusen
Mayors of places in North Rhine-Westphalia
Social Democratic Party of Germany politicians
Women mayors of places in Germany
20th-century German women politicians
21st-century German women politicians
University of Bonn alumni
German schoolteachers